Fu Gu (209–255), courtesy name Lanshi, was an official of the state of Cao Wei during the Three Kingdoms period of China.

Life
Fu Gu grandfather was Fu Rui (傅睿), the Administrator (太守) of Dai Prefecture (代郡) in the late Eastern Han dynasty. His father was Fu Chong (傅充), a Gentleman of the Yellow Gate (黃門侍郎). He had a son, Fu Zhi (傅祗). Fu Xuan (傅宣) and Fu Chang (傅暢) were his grandsons. Already well known in his 20s, Fu Gu was recommended by Chen Qun to serve the Wei government and was appointed as a low-level official.

In those days, the most famous officials in Wei were He Yan, Deng Yang and Xiahou Xuan. Fu Gu disliked them, distanced himself from them, and chose to associate with Xun Can instead. Although Li Feng was from the same home province as Fu Gu, Fu was on bad terms with him and foresaw that Li would eventually ruin his own reputation.

In 240, Fu Gu was appointed as a Gentleman of Writing (尚書郎) and Gentleman of the Yellow Gate (黃門侍郎).

At those days, Cao Shuang appointed He Yan as the Minister of Civil Affairs (吏部尚書) and put He Yan in charge of personnel allocation. Fu Gu advised Cao Xi (曹羲), a brother of Cao Shuang, that He Yan could not be entrusted with an important responsibility. However soon later, as his advice were heard by He Yan, Fu Gu was discharged from his position. After that, he was appointed as the County Prefect (縣令) of Yingyang (滎陽) (滎陽県令) but he rejected the appointment. Later, he accepted an offer from Sima Yi to serve as an Assistant Officer of the Household (從事中郎). After Cao Shuang lost power, he was appointed as Intendant of Henan (河南尹) and Master of Writing (尚書).

In 252, after the death of the Eastern Wu emperor Sun Quan, the Wei generals on the frontline such as Hu Zun, Wang Chang and Guanqiu Jian had the intention of using the opportunity to attack their rival state. When Fu Gu was asked for his opinion, he objected to the campaign against Wu. Although the campaign went ahead, Wei forces led by Hu Zun and Zhuge Dan met their defeat at the Battle of Dongxing in 252 by the Wu forces led by Zhuge Ke. Fu Gu was later awarded the title of a Secondary Marquis (關內侯).

Later in 254, Sima Shi deposed the Wei emperor Cao Fang and replaced him with Cao Mao. Fu Gu was promoted from a Secondary Marquis to the Marquis of Wuxiang Village (武鄉亭侯).

In 255, enraged at the regent Sima Shi for deposing the emperor Cao Fang, Guanqiu Jian and Wen Qin started a rebellion in Shouchun against Sima Shi. As Sima Shi was then suffering from an eye disease, the officials urged him to let Sima Fu lead imperial forces to quell the rebellion. However, Fu Gu, Wang Su and Zhong Hui advised him to personally lead the army instead. Sima Shi heeded their advice. Fu Gu participated in the campaign as Supervisor of the Masters of Writing (尚書僕射). Sima Shi's brother Sima Zhao was also involved. Fu Gu contributed to the suppression of the rebellion. During the campaign, Sima Shi's eye condition worsened and he died days later.

After Sima Shi died in Xuchang, Sima Zhao took over his brother's position as the regent of Wei. In an attempt to prevent a transfer of power from Sima Shi to Sima Zhao, the Wei emperor Cao Mao ordered Sima Zhao to remain in Xuchang and let Fu Gu lead the army back to the capital Luoyang. However, Fu Gu and Zhong Hui met up with Sima Zhao, defied Cao Mao's orders, and returned to the capital together.

Fu Gu was later enfeoffed as the Marquis of Yang District (陽鄉侯). He died in the same year.

See also
 Lists of people of the Three Kingdoms

Notes

References

 Chen, Shou (3rd century). Records of the Three Kingdoms (Sanguozhi).
 Pei, Songzhi (5th century). Annotations to Records of the Three Kingdoms (Sanguozhi zhu).

209 births
255 deaths
Cao Wei politicians